Naima Bayari was a Moroccan Muay Thai kickboxer, who was born in Fez, Morocco, and moved to Nador to practice her sport. She died on November 13, 2012, after a gas leak occurred in her residence in the Al-Kindi neighborhood of Nador. She belonged to the country league Kick Sport Thai Boxing, and she won several Moroccan championships for the Muayi Tai twice, and has participated in many international meetings in Spain and Italy.

See also 

 Badr Hari
 Mustapha Lakhsem
 Khalid Rahilou
 Moroccan Olympic Committee

References

2012 deaths
Female Muay Thai practitioners
Moroccan Muay Thai practitioners